Andreas Seppi was the defending champion but decided not to participate.
Björn Phau won the title after defeating Alexander Kudryavtsev 6–4, 6–4 in the final.

Seeds

Draw

Finals

Top half

Bottom half

References
 Main Draw
 Qualifying Draw

Internazionali Trofeo Lame Perrel-Faip - Singles
2012 Singles